The New Jersey Devils are a professional ice hockey team based in Newark, New Jersey, United States. They are members of the Metropolitan Division of the National Hockey League's (NHL) Eastern Conference. The Devils franchise has been a part of the NHL since 1974, when the team entered the league as the Kansas City Scouts. Two years later, they moved to Denver, Colorado, and became the Colorado Rockies. The team stayed there until 1982, when they moved to New Jersey.

470 players have played on the team; 15 players have had multiple stints. The Devils have won the Stanley Cup three times with a total of 54 different players. Five players (Martin Brodeur, Sergei Brylin, Ken Daneyko, Scott Niedermayer and Scott Stevens) have been a part of all three Cup wins, and eleven more have won two. Of the 282 players, Ken Daneyko has played the most games with the team, playing all 1283 games of his NHL career in New Jersey. On the other end of the spectrum, nine players have played just one regular season game on the team; Steve Brule's only appearance with New Jersey came in the 2000 Stanley Cup Playoffs. The Devils have had eleven captains; Jamie Langenbrunner held the captaincy since December 5, 2007, until he was traded in the middle of the 2010–11 season. He was replaced by Zach Parise at the start of the following season. Nico Hischier is the current captain. The Devils have retired five jersey numbers; #3 for career Devil Ken Daneyko, #4 for longtime captain Scott Stevens,  #27 for Scott Niedermayer, #30 for Martin Brodeur, and #26 for the franchise's all-time leading scorer Patrik Elias. Eleven Devils are enshrined in the Hockey Hall of Fame: Viacheslav Fetisov, Peter Stastny, Scott Stevens, Igor Larionov, Doug Gilmour, Scott Niedermayer, Brendan Shanahan, Joe Nieuwendyk, Phil Housley, Dave Andreychuk and Martin Brodeur.

Patrik Elias surpassed former teammate and head coach John MacLean on March 17, 2009 with his 702nd point to become the Devils' all-time leading scorer.  He also passed MacLean's goal scoring record on December 17, 2011.  Martin Brodeur holds nearly every team record for goaltenders, having been the team's starting goaltender since the 1994–95 NHL season.  In addition to his team records, he is the winningest goaltender in NHL history, notching his 552nd win on March 17, 2009, to pass his childhood idol Patrick Roy.

This list does not include data from the Kansas City Scouts and the Colorado Rockies. The seasons column lists the first year of the season of the player's first game and the last year of the season of the player's last game. All the players that were part of a Stanley Cup winning roster have a blue background on their row.

Key 
 Appeared in an Devils game during the 2021–22 NHL season or is still part of the organization.
 Stanley Cup winner, retired jersey or elected to the Hockey Hall of Fame

Statistics are complete to the end of the 2021–22 NHL season.

Goaltenders

Skaters

References
General
 New Jersey Devils all-time roster at New Jersey Devils.com
 HockeyDB New Jersey Devils all-time statistics at Internet Hockey Database
 Devils current roster at New Jersey Devils.com
Specific

New Jersey Devils players
 
players